Schwansee is a lake in Swabia, Bavaria, Germany. At an elevation of 789,23 m, its surface area is 42 acres.

Lakes of Bavaria
Protected landscapes in Germany
Ammergau Alps